A Little Wife (Italian: Una piccola moglie) is a 1943 Italian "white-telephones" drama film directed by Giorgio Bianchi and starring Fosco Giachetti, Assia Noris and Clara Calamai.

It was shot at the Cinecittà Studios in Rome. The film's sets were designed by the art director Ottavio Scotti.

Cast
 Fosco Giachetti as Giulio Nardi 
 Assia Noris as Lauretta 
 Clara Calamai as Isa 
 Renato Cialente
 Augusto Marcacci
 Camillo Pilotto
 Dino Di Luca
 Armando Migliari
 Ernesto Sabbatini
 Paola Borboni
 Giorgio Costantini
 Totò Mignone
 Giacinto Molteni
 Nino Pavese
 Giuseppe Pierozzi
 Gina Sammarco
 Mario Siletti
 Amedeo Trilli
 Dianora Veiga

References

Bibliography
 Roberto Chiti & Roberto Poppi. I film: Tutti i film italiani dal 1930 al 1944. Gremese Editore, 2005.

External links

1943 films
1940s Italian-language films
1943 drama films
Italian drama films
Italian black-and-white films
Films directed by Giorgio Bianchi
Films shot at Cinecittà Studios
1940s Italian films